63rd Street may refer to:

63rd Street station (disambiguation), stations of the name
63rd Street (Manhattan), New York City
63rd Street (Washington, D.C.)

See also
63rd Street Lines
63rd Street Shuttle
63rd Street Tunnel